The 1999 Louisiana gubernatorial election was held on October 23, 1999, incumbent Republican Mike Foster won reelection to a second term as governor of Louisiana.

Background 
In 1999 all elections in Louisiana—with the exception of U.S. presidential elections—followed a variation of the open primary system called the jungle primary (the system has since been abandoned for all federal elections between 2008 and 2010, but has remained in use for state and local elections). Candidates of any and all parties are listed on one ballot; voters need not limit themselves to the candidates of one party. Unless one candidate takes more than 50% of the vote in the first round, a runoff election is then held between the top two candidates, who may in fact be members of the same party.[2] In this election, the first round of voting was held on October 23, 1999.  Since Foster won over 50% of the vote, the runoff, which would have been held November 20, 1999, was cancelled. Foster was the first Republican in Louisiana to win a second gubernatorial term.

The only parishes carried by Jefferson were his home of Orleans and East Carroll, where Jefferson's birthplace, Lake Providence serves as the parish seat.

Results  
Foster easily won reelection with 62.17% of the vote. Due to Foster winning more than 50% of the vote, there was no runoff. Jefferson only won two parishes, Orleans Parish and East Carroll Parish. Democratic candidates cumulatively won 33.89% of the vote. 

First voting round, October 23

Runoff did not occur due to Foster winning outright

Sources 
Louisiana Secretary of State Elections Division.  Official Election Results Database

1999
Gubernatorial
Louisiana